Mungen is an unincorporated community in Wood County, in the U.S. state of Ohio.

History
Mungen had its start when the Coldwater Railroad was extended to that point. A post office called Mungen was established in 1868, and remained in operation until 1909.

References

Unincorporated communities in Wood County, Ohio
Unincorporated communities in Ohio